Chennaiyin Football Club is a professional association football club based in Chennai, India, that plays in Indian Super League. The club was formed in 2014 and played its first competitive match on 15 October 2014 and defeated FC Goa by 2-1 due well anticipated the goals of Balwant Singh and Elano. The club won two ISL titles, and appeared as the runner-ups of the Super Cup. The club was the first ISL to appear in AFC Cup and went up to Group stage in 2019 edition whereby they made second rank on the table. They failed to make into knockouts .

List of players
Appearances and goals are for Indian Super League and Super Cup  matches only.
Players are listed according to the date of their first team debut for the club. Only players with at least one appearance are included.

Statistics correct as of 28 August 2020

Table headers
 Nationality – If a player played international football, the country/countries he played for are shown. Otherwise, the player's nationality is given as their country of birth.
 Career span – The year of the player's first appearance for Chennaiyin FC  to the year of his last appearance.
 Matches – The total number of games played, both as a starter and as a substitute
The list includes all the players registered under a Chennaiyin FC contract. Some players might not have featured in a professional game for the club.

List of marquee players

By nationality
As of 25 October 2020.

All Players

References

Lists of Indian Super League players
Chennaiyin FC-related lists
Chennaiyin FC players
Lists of association football players by club in India
Association football player non-biographical articles